Greek Australians are Australians of Greek ancestry. Greek Australians are one of the largest groups within the global Greek diaspora. As per the 2021 census, 424,750 people stated that they had Greek ancestry (whether alone or in combination with another ancestry), comprising 1.7% of the Australian population. At the 2021 census, 92,314 Australian residents were born in Greece.

Greek immigration to Australia has been one of the largest migratory flows in the history of Australia, especially after World War II and the Greek Civil War. The flow of migrants from Greece increased slightly in 2015 due to the economic crisis in Greece, with Australia as one of the main destinations for departing Greeks, mainly to Melbourne, where the Greek Australian community is most deeply established.

88% of Greek Australians speak Greek and 91% are members of the Greek Orthodox Church.

Australia and Greece also have a close bilateral relationship based on historical ties and the rich contribution of Greek Australians to Australian society. In 2019, the export of Australian services to Greece was valued at $92 million, while services imports from Greece totalled $750 million. Australia's stock of investment in Greece in 2019 totalled $481 million, while investment in Australia from Greece was $192 million.

History

Early Greek immigration
Greek immigration to Australia began in the early colonial period in the 19th century. The first known Greeks arrived in 1829. These Greeks were seven sailors, convicted of piracy by a British naval court, and were sentenced to transportation to New South Wales. Though they were eventually pardoned, two of those seven Greeks stayed and settled in the country. One settled on the Monaro Plains in Southern New South Wales and one at Picton near Sydney. Their names were Ghikas Bulgaris known as Jigger Bulgari, and Andonis Manolis. Jigger Bulgari married an Irish woman, and they had many children. Jigger was buried at Nimmitabel Pioneer Cemetery. The Hellenic Club of Canberra laid a commemorative marble plaque over his resting place around 2000. Andonis Manolis' grave is in the old cemetery at Mittagong. The first known free Greek migrant to Australia was Katerina Georgia Plessos (1809–1907), who arrived in Sydney with her husband Major James Crummer in 1835. They married in 1827 on the island of Kalamos where Crummer, the island's commandant, met the young refugee from the Greek independence wars. In her youth, she must have been one of the last living people to speak to Lord Byron. They lived in Sydney, Newcastle and Port Macquarie. They had 11 children. The first wave of free Hellenic migrants commenced in the 1850s, and continued through the end of the 19th century, prompted in part by the recent discovery of gold in the country. A young Greek immigrant born in Athens, Greece named Georgios Tramountanas (1822 – 29 January 1911) and anglicised as George North in 1858, was the first settler of Greek origin in South Australia in 1842. The Greek community of South Australia regards North (Tramountanas) as their Pioneering Grandfather. In 1901, the year of federation, the Australian census recorded 878 native Greeks that were born there (In Greece), now living in Australia. Many of these Greeks were owners of or were employed in shops and restaurants. Some were also cane-cutters in Queensland.

20th century Greek immigration

From the last decade of the 19th century until World War I, the number of Greeks immigrating to Australia increased steadily and Hellenic communities were reasonably well established in Melbourne and Sydney at this time. The Greek language press began in Australia and in 1913, Australia had the first Greek weekly newspaper called Afstralia that was published in Melbourne. During World War I, Greece remained neutral, eventually joining the side of the Allies. In 1916, the Australian government responded to this by placing a special prohibition on the entry of Greeks and Maltese people to Australia that was not lifted until 1920. There were a number of anti-Greek outbursts as a result of the neutrality stance by Greece, often instigated by Australian soldiers on leave. During these outbursts, Greek shops and Greek cafés were badly damaged or destroyed, with the worst rioting occurring in Kalgoorlie and Boulder.

During the 1920s, as a result of the Greco-Turkish War there was a significant amount of Greek migration to Darwin, Northern Territory and across the Top End. Greeks often worked in the canefields in North Queensland and move to Darwin during the dry season to work in the pearling industry. One famous family of Greek Australians, the Paspaley family from the island of Kastellorizo, excelled in the Pearling industry and have stores across Australia with their main store in Darwin. It is noted that the first major flow of Greek immigrants to Australia began in the mid 1920s, where many Greek people from Kastellorizo migrated to Australia to escape the Ottoman repression. Numerous of these people from Greece's easternmost island spent time in Egypt's second largest city, Alexandria, before being offered migration to Australia by British authorities. Those of Kastellorizian descent living in Australia now refer to themselves as 'Kazzies,' and have maintained a strong and unique community.

During the interwar period, the number of Greeks migrating to Australia increased substantially. Some Greeks who settled in Australia were expelled from Asia Minor after the Greek military defeat and the genocide committed by Turkey between 1913 and 1922, while other Greeks sought entry after the USA established restrictive immigration quotas in the early 1920s. From 1924 until 1936 a series of regulations operating in Australia severely restricted the number of Greeks permitted to immigrate to and settle in Australia.

Greece entered World War II with the Allies when she was invaded by German and Italian forces, who remained in Greece until 1944. Many ANZACs went to the nation and tried to help the population to defeat the Axis enemy only to be saved themselves by the locals, building a relationship between Australians and Greeks that stands strong to this day. When troops withdrew a struggle broke out between pro and anti-communist factions which resulted in civil war between 1946 and 1949, ending with the defeat of the communists, but at a cost of many Greek lives and the uprooting of children who were kidnapped and taken from their families.

The Greek government, devastated by the destruction of infrastructure and the mass looting of their banks by the Germans, encouraged post-war migration as a way of solving poverty and unemployment problems. Post WWII in the late 1940s, 1950s, and 1960s, Greeks were one of the main European races picked by the Australian government's "Populate or perish" immigration scheme and due to this, thousands of Greeks migrated to Australia to gain a better life and future for themselves and their families. The main destinations where these "Hellenes" immigrated were cities such as Melbourne, Sydney and Adelaide. During these decades, Greeks began to establish their own restaurants, Hellenic Community Clubs, and Greek-Australian soccer clubs. Greeks along with Italians, Croatians, Maltese, Serbians, Jews, Hungarians, Czechs, etc. marked a milestone on Australian sport in general by forming many successful Association football clubs. The most successful Australian clubs with Greek heritage and culture are South Melbourne Hellas (South Melbourne FC) founded in 1959, Alexander the Great (Heidelberg United FC) founded in 1958, Pan-Hellenic (Sydney Olympic FC) founded in 1957, West Adelaide Hellas (West Adelaide SC) founded in 1962 and Brisbane Pan Rhodian (Olympic FC) founded in 1967. All five clubs were founded by Greek immigrants that immigrated to those respective cities.

After the changes in Greece from the mid 1970s, including the fall of the Papadopoulos regime in 1974 and the formal inclusion of Greece into the European Union, Greek immigration to Australia has slowed since the 1971 peak of 160,200 arrivals. Within Australia, the Greek immigrants have been "extremely well organised socially and politically", with approximately 600 Greek organisations in the country by 1973, and immigrants have strived to maintain their faith and cultural identity.

By comparison, the Greek Cypriot community in Australia doubled following the Invasion of Cyprus by Turkey following a campaign of ethnic cleansing in 1974.

21st century Greek immigration 

Since the year 2000, Greek immigration to Australia has slowed down. However, in the years 2000–2009, many Greek-Australians both native Greek and Australian-born, returned to Greece to discover their homeland and reconnect with their ancestral roots. Yet, as the economic crisis in Greece grew, the opportunities for temporary resident Greek Australians abroad were limited. For this reason, many Greek Australians have shortened their planned long term stays in Greece and have returned home to Australia.

In the early 2010s, there has been an increase of Greek immigration flows to Australia due to unemployment, among other issues, because of the economic crisis in Greece. This has led to the return of many Greek Australians which had gone to Greece before the crisis and also the arrival of newcomers from Greece, who have been received by the large Greek Australian community, mainly in Melbourne.

Demographics

At the 2021 census, 424,750 people stated that they had Greek ancestry (whether alone or in combination with another ancestry), comprising 1.7% of the Australian population. At the 2021 census, 92,314 Australian residents were born in Greece.

The largest concentration of Greek Australians is in the state of Victoria, which is often regarded as the heartland of the Greek Australian community. Victoria's capital Melbourne has the largest Greek Australian community in Australia.

The 2021 census showed that the following states had the largest numbers of people nominating Greek ancestry: Victoria (181,184), New South Wales (141,627), South Australia (40,704), Queensland (32,702), Western Australia (16,117).

One study investigating the 54 most common ethnic groups in Australia found that Greek Australians had the lowest rate of intermarriage (marrying outside their ethnicity) than every other ethnicity in the first, second and third generations.

Culture

Religion
According to census data released by the Australian Bureau of Statistics in 2016, 91.4% of Australians with Greek ancestry are Christian, mainly Eastern Orthodox, however minorities who belong to different Christian denominations like Catholics, Jehovah's Witnesses and Pentecostals also exist. Together, these other denominations make up 0.4% of the Greek Australian population. 5.6% identified as spiritual, secular or irreligious, and 2.6% did not answer the census question on religion. Greek Australians are predominantly Greek Orthodox. The largest religious body of Greek Orthodox Australians is the Greek Orthodox Archdiocese of Australia, with its headquarters at the Cathedral of The Annunciation of Our Lady in the inner Sydney suburb of Redfern. According to SBS, Greeks in Australia have got higher weekly church attendance and higher levels of religiosity than Greeks in Greece.

Greek language
In 2016, the Greek language was spoken at home by 237,588 Australian residents, a 5.8% decrease from the 2011 census data. Greek is the seventh most commonly spoken language in Australia after English, Mandarin, Arabic, Cantonese, Vietnamese and Italian. The remainder of the ethnic Greek population in Australia mainly use English as their first language.

Media 
The Greek language press had begun in Australia in 1913 when the first Greek weekly newspaper was published in Melbourne. In South Australia, the local Greek community published a short-lived newspaper called Okeanis (Oceania), around 1914 before it moved to Sydney. On 16 November 1926, George Marsellos and John Stilson published a broadsheet under the name Panellenios Keryx (Panhellenic Herald or The Greek Herald), becoming the second national Greek newspaper in Australia. In 1935 and 1936 a third newspaper, Pharos (Lighthouse), was published, and a number of short-lived titles were issued in the late 1960s, with the longest of these being Tachydromos (Mailman), founded in September 1968. In 1957, Hellenic/Greek language newspaper Neos Kosmos was founded by Dimitri Gogos, Bill Stefanou and Alekos Doukas, the latter also being an exceptionally well known author. Since 1994, a publication called Paroikiako Vema (Steps in the adopted Country) and printed in Renmark, has served the Greek community in rural South Australia.

Multicultural broadcaster SBS (Special Broadcasting Service) airs a Greek-language radio program every afternoon from 4 PM to 6 PM. The program features news, current affairs, music, interviews, and a talkback segment, where listeners can dial into the program from 5:30 PM onwards and express their opinion on a topic being focused on. Additionally, SBS also airs Greek public broadcaster ERT's Eidiseis news program every morning as part of their WorldWatch programming block.

Notable individuals

Academic
 Nikos Athanasou – Professor of Musculoskeletal Pathology at Oxford University and Greek-Australian novelist.
Nick (Νικήτας) Birbilis – Professor of Engineering at the Australian National University.
 Adrian David Cheok – Professor of Pervasive Computing at City University London & Director of the Mixed Reality Lab
 Nicholas Doumanis – Assoc. Professor of History, at the University of New South Wales
 Nikolas Kompridis – Professorial Fellow at the University of Western Sydney in the School of Humanities & Communication Arts
Christos Pantelis – Professor of Psychiatry, University of Melbourne
 Maria Skyllas-Kazacos – Emeritus Professor at the University of New South Wales, chemical engineer best known for her pioneering work of the vanadium redox battery
 John Tasioulas – Director of Institute for Ethics in AI and Professor of Ethics and Legal Philosophy at University of Oxford and first Greek-Australian Rhodes Scholar

Art and design
 Con Chrisoulis – comic book creator
 Nonda Katsalidis – architect
 Marc Newson – industrial designer
 Polixeni Papapetrou – artist
 Paul Pholeros – architect
 Tony Rafty – caricaturist
 Stelarc (Stelios Arkadiou) – artist
 Christos Tsiolkas – writer
 Michael Zavros – artist/painter

Business
Harry Katsiabanis
 Mark Bouris – managing director of Wizard
 George Calombaris – chef, former judge MasterChef Australia
 Con Constantine – former chairman, Newcastle United Jets
 Andrew Demetriou – chief executive, Australian Football League

 Antony J. J. Lucas – businessman noted for his philanthropic activities
 Marinos Lucas – businessman, theatre company operator
 Andrew N. Liveris – CEO of Dow Chemical Company

 Kostas Makris – the richest Greek in Australia (in the top 30 of the richest residents in Australia)
 Nick Pappas – chairman, South Sydney Rabbitohs
 Nicholas Paspaley Senior and Paspaley family (Paspalis) – Paspaley dominate the pearling industry; large property holdings in Darwin CBD and properties in Sydney
 George Peponis – chairman, Canterbury Bulldogs
 Geoff Polites – chief executive officer of Australian Jaguar Land RoverFPV President / Tickford managing director
 Nick Politis – car retailer and chairman of the Sydney Roosters rugby league club
 James Samios – Hon. MBE Museum of Contemporary Art, Circular Quay, Sydney
 Peter V'landys – chairman of the Australian Rugby League Commission

Fashion
 Christopher Chronis – fashion designer
 Napoleon Perdis – make-up artist
 Alex Perry – fashion designer

Film, theatre, and television
 Peter Andrikidis – director, Underbelly
 Alex Andreas – actor
 Alex Blias – actor
 Alex Papps – actor, Play School 
 Elena Carapetis – actress
 Gia Carides – actress
 Zoe Carides – actress
 Wayne Coles-Janess – director and producer
 Chantal Contouri – actress
 Mary Coustas – comedian
 Alex Dimitriades – actor
 Rebekah Elmaloglou – actress, Home and Away and Neighbours
 Sebastian Elmaloglou – actor, Home and Away, brother of Rebekah
 Damien Fotiou – actor
 Nick Giannopoulos – actor and director
 Diana Glenn – actress
 George Houvardas – actor, Packed to the Rafters
 Hugh Jackman – actor
 George Kapiniaris – actor and comedian
 Peter Kelamis – comedian
 Costas Kilias – actor
 Ana Kokkinos – director
 Katerina Kotsonis - actor
 Nico Lathouris – actor
 Costas Mandylor – actor
 Louis Mandylor – actor
 Lex Marinos – actor, director, writer and broadcaster
 Harry Michaels – actor (TV series: Number 96) producer (Exercise Video: Aerobics Oz Style), Sports TV Director
 Bill Miller – director and producer
 George Miller – Academy Award-winning director and producer, Babe, Happy Feet, Mad Max: Fury Road

 Ada Nicodemou – actress, Home and Away
 Phaedra Nicolaidis – actress
 Tony Nikolakopoulos – actor and director
 Socratis Otto – actor, known for television series Young Lions, and Wentworth
 Alex Papps – actor and Play School host
 Thaao Penghlis – actor (has played Tony DiMera and André DiMera on American soap opera Days of Our Lives)
 Alex Proyas – director, I, Robot, Dark City, The Crow, Knowing

 Jordan Raskopoulos – comedienne and singer
 Steen Raskopoulos – actor and comedian
 Gina Riley – actress, Kath & Kim, comedienne, entertainer and singer
 Nathan Saidden – comedian
 George Spartels – actor
 Nadia Tass – director
 John Tatoulis – director and producer
 Maria Theodorakis – actress
 Alkinos Tsilimidos – director
 Olympia Valance – model and actress, Neighbours
 Zoe Ventoura – actress
 Helen Zerefos – actress and cabaret singer

Journalism
Nick Adams - also known as Nick Adamopoulos, US based political commentator
Dimitri Gogos – late editor, Neos Kosmos
Georgia Cassimatis – journalist, Australian Cosmopolitan magazine
 George Donikian – news presenter, Ten Network
 Peter Frilingos – sports journalist with the Daily Telegraph in Sydney, and broadcaster and commentator with the Continuous Call Team
 Helen Kapalos – journalist, reporter Sunday Night, Seven Network
Patricia Karvelas – journalist, ABC
 Mary Kostakidis – journalist, SBS
 John Mangos – news presenter and journalist, Sky News Australia
 George Megalogenis – author and formerThe Australian newspaper journalist
 Harry Nicolaides – novelist 
 Peter Peters – sports broadcaster and commentator

Justice

 Chris Kourakis – Chief Justice of the Supreme Court of South Australia
 Emilios Kyrou – Justice of the Supreme Court of Victoria

Music
 Peter Andre – singer, entertainer
 Alex Carapetis – drummer
 Kaz James – singer and DJ
 James Kannis – singer (Australian Idol)
 Chris Karan – jazz drummer (Dudley Moore Trio) and studio percussionist (Bob Marley & the Wailers)
 Vasilliki Karagiorgos (Vassy) – singer and songwriter
 John Lemmone – flute player and composer
 Orianthi Panagaris – guitarist/musician
 Sally Polihronas – singer (Bardot)
 Nick Skitz – deejay-producer
 Costas Tsicaderis – singer-songwriter

Politics
 Nick Bolkus – federal politician
 Michael Costa – former Finance Minister, New South Wales
 Steve Dimopoulos – politician, Victoria
 Jim Fouras – politician, Queensland
 Steve Georganas – federal politician
 Petro Georgiou – federal politician
 John Hatzistergos – Attorney General, New South Wales
 Peter Katsambanis – former politician, Victoria
 Steve Kons – Deputy Premier, Tasmania
 Nicholas Kotsiras – Minister, Victoria
 Tom Koutsantonis – Minister for Trade, South Australia
 Michael McCormack - former Deputy Prime Minister of Australia
 Ken Michael – politician
 Jenny Mikakos – former Health Minister, Victoria
 John Pandazopoulos – politician, Victoria
 Drew Pavlou – student activist at the University of Queensland
 Eleni Marie Petinos – politician, New South Wales 
 Nick Staikos – politician, Victoria
 Andrew Theophanous – federal politician, Victoria (born Cyprus)
 Theo Theophanous – politician, Victoria (born Cyprus)
 Kat Theophanous – politician, Victoria
 Arthur Sinodinos – former Chief of Staff, PM John Howard
 Maria Vamvakinou – federal politician, Victoria
 Kon Vatskalis – politician, Northern Territory
 Nick Xenophon – politician, South Australia
 Sophie Mirabella – federal politician, Victoria

Religion
 Archbishop Stylianos Harkianakis – former Primate of the Greek Orthodox Archdiocese of Australia
Archbishop Makarios Griniezakis – current Primate of the Greek Orthodox Archdiocese of Australia

Science and technology
 Professor Manuel Aroney – organic chemistry
 Gerasimos Danilatos – physicist, inventor of environmental scanning electron microscope
 George North (Tramountanas) – pastoralist, sheep farmer and first Greek to settle in South Australia in 1842
 Christos Pantelis – psychiatrist
 George Paxinos – Professor of Psychology at the University of New South Wales
 Michael Kyrios – clinical psychologist

Sport

Australian rules football

 Luke Beveridge – Melbourne, Footscray & St Kilda player
 Ang Christou – Carlton player
 Andrew Demetriou – North Melbourne & Hawthorn player (later League CEO)
 Josh Francou – Port Adelaide player
 Gary Frangalas – Sydney & Richmond player
 John Georgiades – Footscray player
 John Georgiou – St.Kilda player
 Con Gorozidis – St.Kilda & Footscray player
 Athas Hrysoulakis – Collingwood player
 Peter Kanis – Hawthorn player
 Arthur Karanicolas – North Melbourne player
 Patrick Karnezis – Brisbane & Collingwood player
 Paul Koulouriotis – Port Adelaide & Geelong player
 Spiro Kourkoumelis – Carlton & St Kilda player
 Anthony Koutoufides – Carlton player
 Angelo Lekkas – Hawthorn player
 Spiro Malakellis – Geelong player
 Tony Malakellis – Geelong & Sydney player
 Steve Malaxos – Hawthorn & West Coast player
 Daniel Metropolis – West Coast & Fremantle player
 Russell Morris – Hawthorn & St Kilda player
 Chris Pavlou – Carlton player
 Phillip Poursanidis – Carlton player
 Lou Richards – Collingwood player
 Ron Richards – Collingwood player
 John Rombotis – Fitzroy, Port Adelaide & Richmond player
 Tony Spassopoulos – Fitzroy player
 Jimmy Toumpas – Melbourne & Port Adelaide player
 Jason Traianidis – St Kilda player
 Zeno Tzatzaris – Footscray player
 David Zaharakis – Essendon player

Boxing and kickboxing
 Evangelos Goussis – Kickboxer and Boxer, convicted murderer
 George Kambosos Jr. – Professional boxer
 Michael Katsidis – Professional Boxer, former WBA and WBO lightweight champion
 Stan Longinidis – Kickboxer, former World Kickboxing Champion
 Tosca Petridis – Kickboxer, former World Kickboxing Champion

Cricket
 Jason Gillespie – retired Australia international cricketer
 Marcus Stoinis – Australia international cricketer
 Peter Hatzoglou – Melbourne Renegades bowler

Flying disc
 Maxwell Gratton – CEO, Flying Disc Australia

Soccer
 John Anastasiadis – former player of Heidelberg United, PAOK, South Melbourne and Yarraville Glory. Represented the Socceroos at U21 level. Coached Yarraville Glory, South Melbourne, Oakleigh Cannons and is current coach of Bentleigh Greens.
 Panos Armenakas – player, Udinese Calcio
 Con Blatsis – former player of South Melbourne, Derby County, Sheffield Wednesday (on loan), Colchester United, Kocaelispor and St Patrick's Athletic. Represented the Socceroos at U20, U23 and senior level.
 Con Boutsianis – former player of South Melbourne, Heidelberg United, Collingwood Warriors, Bentleigh Greens, Perth Glory, Bolton Wanderers, Bulleen Zebras, Oakleigh Cannons, Essendon United and Malvern City. He represented the Socceroos at senior level.
 Dean Bouzanis – player Melbourne City and former Liverpool FC
 Jason Davidson – player Melbourne Victory and former Socceroos
 Chris Kalantzis – player
 Evan Kostopoulos – player, Adelaide United
 Stan Lazaridis – player, Perth Glory and Socceroos
 Apostolos Stamatelopoulos – player, Adelaide United and Western United
 Michalis 'Mike' Mandalis - player, one of Australia's all-time greats South Melbourne and Melbourne Hakoah
 Lucas Pantelis – former player
 Jim Patikas – former player, first Australian participant in UEFA Champions League, former Socceroos
 Ange Postecoglou – coach Socceroos and Celtic, former player
 Peter Raskopoulos - player, Sydney Olympic FC
 Nick Theodorakopoulos – coach
 Michael Theoklitos – player, Brisbane Roar
 Michael Valkanis – coach, Melbourne City and Greece national football team assistant
 Andy Vlahos – player
 Charlie Yankos – Former Socceroos captain
 Terry Antonis – player, Western Sydney Wanderers
 Apostolos Giannou – player, Kerala Blasters
 Avraam Papadopoulos – player, Australian born Greece national football team member
 Jesse Makarounas – player, Melbourne Victory
 Dimitri Petratos – player, Brisbane Roar
 Chris Ikonomidis – player, Melbourne Victory
 Anthony Lesiotis – player, Melbourne City

Mixed martial arts
 George Sotiropoulos – former UFC mixed martial artist
 Alexander Volkanovski – UFC mixed martial artist

Rugby league
 Braith Anasta – player, Sydney Roosters
 Jason Demetriou - player/coach
 George Gatis – player, New Zealand Warriors
 Steve Georgallis – player/coach
 Michael Korkidas – player, Salford City Reds
 Nick Kouparitsas – player, Canterbury Bulldogs
 Glenn Lazarus – player Canberra Raiders, Brisbane Broncos and Melbourne Storm
 Billy Magoulias — player, Cronulla Sharks
 George Peponis – former Australian captain
 Peter Peters - player, Manly-Warringah
 Willie Peters – player, South Sydney Rabbitohs
 Jim Serdaris – player, South Sydney, Canterbury-Bankstown Bulldogs
 John Skandalis – player, Huddersfield Giants
 Jason Stevens – player, St-George Illawarra Dragons, Cronulla-Sutherland Sharks
 Justin Tsoulos – player, Parramatta Eels
 Arthur Kitinas – player/coach, South Sydney Sydney Roosters

Sailing
 Edward Psaltis – sailor

Shooting
 Michael Diamond – shooter – Olympic gold medallist, Sydney 2000

Skateboarding
 Tas Pappas – former World No.1
 Ben Pappas

Skiing
 Lydia Lassila – skier

Tennis
 Mark Philippoussis – player
 Nick Kyrgios – player
 Thanasi Kokkinakis – player

Weightlifting
 Robert Kabbas - athlete
 Bill Stellios - athlete

Wrestling
 Tony Kontellis – professional wrestler
 Spiros Manousakis (Spiros Arion) – wrestler

See also

 Australia–Greece relations
 Cypriot Australians
 European Australians
 Europeans in Oceania
 Greek Cypriots
 Greek New Zealanders
 Greek Orthodox churches in New South Wales
 Greek community of Melbourne
 Greeks
 Immigration to Australia
 Neos Kosmos

References

Bibliography
 Tamis, Anastasios (2005). The Greeks in Australia. Cambridge University Press. 
 
 Alexakis, Effy and Janiszewski, Leonard (1998). In Their Own Image: Greek-Australians. Hale & Iremonger Pty Limited. 
 Alexakis, Effy and Janiszewski, Leonard (1995). Images of Home: Mavri Xenitia. Hale & Iremonger Pty Limited. 
 Alexakis, Effy and Janiszewski, Leonard (2013). Selling an American Dream: Australia's Greek Cafe. Macquarie University. 
 Alexakis, Effy and Janiszewski, Leonard (2016). Greek Cafes & Milk Bars of Australia. Halstead Press.

External links
  (Greeks in Sydney) [CC-By-SA]
 A video of Peter Yiannoudes, who established Greek Cinema in Victoria in the 1950s on Culture Victoria
 Meet me at the Paragon digital stories, State Library of Queensland. Digital stories relating to Greek Australian owned café and milk bars in Queensland

Immigration to Australia
European Australian
Australia